Eilean Fladday (also Fladda) is a previously populated tidal island off Raasay, near the Isle of Skye, Scotland.

Geography
Eilean Fladday lies off the north west coast of Raasay, across Caol Fladday (Kyle Fladda), which dries at half-tide.

Once a thriving crofting community, the island now only has three cottages which are used by the  families who own them for about seven months a year. The population is recorded as 29 (1841), 51 (1891), 12 (1951) and 12 (1971). Five families lived there in the late 1920s. Their petition to Inverness County Council to build a road and footbridge was rejected. A subsequent appeal to the Education Department to provide a school, was successful only after a rate strike. Raasay crofter, Calum MacLeod (who later built "Calum's Road") constructed a track from Torran to Fladda between 1949 and 1952. This did not stem the exodus from the island and the last families left Fladda in 1965.

See also 

 List of islands of Scotland

References

Former populated places in Scotland
Uninhabited islands of Highland (council area)
Raasay